Henk Rogers (born 24 December 1953)  is a Dutch video game designer and entrepreneur. He is known for producing Japan's first major turn-based role-playing video game The Black Onyx, securing the rights to distribute Tetris on video game consoles where the game found popularity, and as the founder of Bullet-Proof Software (now called Blue Planet Software) and The Tetris Company, which licenses the Tetris trademark. He was instrumental in resolving licensing disputes that brought Tetris to the Game Boy. Today, he is managing director of The Tetris Company.

Beyond video games 

Beyond Tetris and other video game endeavors, Rogers has founded or cofounded several community- and sustainability-oriented organizations and companies.

The first of these was Blue Planet Foundation, a 501(c)(3) public charity focused on activities of advocacy, which Rogers founded in 2007 to build awareness and fostering action for clean energy in Hawaii. In 2015, the foundation led the campaign to make Hawaii the first state in the nation with a 100% renewable energy law.

Following this, Rogers joined his daughter Maya Rogers and local angel investor Chenoa Farnsworth to launch Blue Startups, a Honolulu-based startup accelerator to mentor, invest in, and encourage the founding of young technology companies, focusing on those who serve the cross-Pacific region and/or several targeted interest areas.

In 2015, Rogers then founded Blue Planet Energy, one of the leading providers of energy storage systems (i.e., batteries) that power homes, businesses and critical infrastructure.

Rogers is also chairman of the Pacific International Space Center for Exploration Systems (PISCES) and founder of the International MoonBase Alliance, which developed the Hawaii Space Exploration Analog and Simulation (HI-SEAS), a 1,200 square-foot Mars and moon analog habitat on Mauna Loa. PISCES' core mission is to develop and grow an aerospace industry in Hawaii through applied research, workforce development and economic development initiatives.

In Media
Portrayed by actor Taron Egerton, a character based on Rogers appears in the 2023 film Tetris.

References

External links
www.tetris.com
Interview with Planet GameCube
GameSpot news report on Blue Lava Wireless sale
Blue Mars
Blue Lava Technologies
Blue Planet Foundation
Blue Startups
Blue Planet Energy

1953 births
Living people
Dutch computer programmers
Dutch emigrants to the United States
Businesspeople from Amsterdam
University of Hawaiʻi alumni
Businesspeople from Hawaii